A Certified National Accountant is a qualified professional accountant that has met the educational qualification and professional experience requirements for membership of Association of National Accountants of Nigeria (ANAN), and has been accepted as a member of the association. The Certified National Accountant is also the title of a quarterly journal of ANAN. 

Accountancy graduates with a B.Sc. and Higher National Diploma from Nigerian Universities and Polytechnics qualify for admission to a  three-year training program at the Nigerian College of Accountancy, Jos.
On successful completion of the examinations they earn the designation of Certified National Accountant (CNA) and qualify to join ANAN.

References

Accounting qualifications
Post-nominal letters
Accounting in Nigeria